Park Su-jin may refer to:

Park Soo-jin (born 1985), South Korean actress, singer, and model
Park Soo-jin (singer, born 1995), South Korean singer
Park Su-jin (born 1999), South Korean swimmer